Samiullah (born 11 November 1996) is a Pakistani cricketer. He made his first-class debut for Federally Administered Tribal Areas in the 2017–18 Quaid-e-Azam Trophy on 3 October 2017. He made his List A debut for Federally Administered Tribal Areas in the 2017–18 Regional One Day Cup on 4 February 2018.

He made his Twenty20 debut for Federally Administered Tribal Areas in the 2018–19 National T20 Cup on 11 December 2018. He was the leading run-scorer for Federally Administered Tribal Areas in the tournament, with 163 runs in seven matches.

References

External links
 

1996 births
Living people
Pakistani cricketers
Place of birth missing (living people)
Federally Administered Tribal Areas cricketers
Peshawar Zalmi cricketers